Hruševica is a small village southwest of Štanjel in the Municipality of Komen in the Littoral region of Slovenia next to the border with Italy.

The local church is dedicated to Saint Joseph and belongs to the Parish of Štanjel.

References

External links
Hruševica on Geopedia

Populated places in the Municipality of Komen